Tamimi or Temimi (Arabic: التميمي) is an Arabic surname that may refer to
Abdeljelil Temimi (born 1938), Tunisian historian
Fondation Temimi pour la recherche scientifique et l'information, a Tunisian research institution founded by Abdeljelil
Abdul Aziz bin Hars bin Asad Yemeni Tamimi (816–944), Muslim saint 
Abdulla Al-Tamimi (born 1994), squash player who represents Qatar
Abu Al Fazal Abdul Wahid Yemeni Tamimi (842–1034), Yemeni Sufi saint
Ahed Tamimi (born 2001), Palestinian activist
Ahlam Tamimi (born 1980), Palestinian terrorist
Al-Hurr ibn Yazid al Tamimi, 7th century military general
Al-Qaqa ibn Amr al-Tamimi, 7th century Arab general
Alaa al-Tamimi (born 1952), Mayor of Baghdad 
Al-Tamimi, the physician, 10th century Arab physician
Ali al-Tamimi (born 1963), American biologist and Islamic teacher 
Amal Tamimi (born 1960), Icelandic-Palestinian feminist, social activist, and politician
Ammar Al-Tamimi (born 1988), squash player who represents Kuwait
Asim ibn 'Amr al-Tamimi, 7th century military leader of Rashidun Caliphate 
Azzam Tamimi (born 1955), British Palestinian academic and political activist
Aymenn Jawad Al-Tamimi, British Islamic scholar 
Bassem al-Tamimi (born c. 1967), Palestinian activist
Ibn Abi Ramtha al-Tamimi, 7th-century physician
Janna Tamimi, commonly known as Janna Jihad, Palestinian youth activist and amateur journalist
Jassim Al Tamimi (born 1971), Qatari football midfielder 
Jonathan Tamimi (born 1994), Swedish football player
Khazim ibn Khuzayma al-Tamimi (fl. 749–768), Khurasani Arab military leader
Majed Al-Tamimi (born 1971), Saudi Arabian sport shooter
Mohammed ibn Qasim al-Tamimi (1140/5-1207/8), Moroccan hadith
Muhammed ibn Umail al-Tamimi, 10th century alchemist 
Munzir ibn Sawa Al Tamimi, 7th century governor of the Persian Sasanid Empire 
Musa ibn Ka'b al-Tamimi, 8th-century Arab commander
Rafiq al-Tamimi (1889–1957), Palestinian Arab educator and political figure
Salmann Tamimi (born 1955), Icelandic-Palestinian Muslim, brother of Amal
Sami Tamimi, Palestinian chef
Shihab al-Tamimi (died 2008), Iraqi journalist
Taissir Tamimi, chief Islamic judge of the Palestinian National Authority
Ya'qub ibn Ishaq al-Tamimi, 10th century naval commander
Essam Al Tamimi, Founder and Chairman of Al Tamimi & Company

See also
Tamim (name)

Arabic-language surnames